J Kristopher (born November 23, 1976) is an American film and television actor from Houston, Texas. He is known for his work in the Parenthood and Straight Outta Compton, and is a featured comedic actor in the sketch comedies on Conan.

Background 
J Kristopher began his career in Dallas, Texas while attending college at Southern Methodist University. After having a successful run featured in local commercials and theater productions, J Kristopher moved to Los Angeles, California in 2006 to pursue acting full-time; where he landed his first role on the TV series, LA Forensics.  His body of work continued to grow.

J Kristopher has gained success on both the big screen including, independent and studio films, plus the small screen, web series, as well as being the face of many national commercial campaigns including: MasterCard, Lowe's, Dancing with the Stars, GMC, Trivial Pursuit, Nickelodeon, VH1, Fox Sports, and Super Bowl print campaign with Target. He played Larry "Laylaw" Goodman in the 2015 biographical film Straight Outta Compton, and often starred in sketch comedy scenes on the talk show Conan. He has over 80 television, film, and commercial credits to his name.

Filmography

Television

Television - Sketch Comedy

Film

References

External links
 

1976 births
Living people
Southern Methodist University alumni
21st-century American male actors
American male television actors
American male film actors
Male actors from Houston